Fred W. Parks (September 1, 1871 – 1941) was the 15th Lieutenant Governor of Colorado, United States, serving from July 1905 to January 1907 under Jesse Fuller McDonald. Originally from Genesco, New York, Parks moved to Denver, Colorado in 1893. He earned his law degree in 1895 after studying at the University of Denver and the Colorado State University. A Republican, Parks was elected to the state Senate in 1897 and re-elected in 1904.

References

"Colorado Lieutenant Governors – Parks, Fred W.". Official State of Colorado website. January 14, 2003. Accessed February 8, 2012.

Lieutenant Governors of Colorado
1871 births
1941 deaths
University of Denver alumni
Colorado State University alumni
American lawyers
Colorado Republicans